From an Ancient Star is the third studio album by Belbury Poly.

Track listing

2009 albums
Belbury Poly albums
Ghost Box Music albums